Lower Santan Village is a census-designated place (CDP) in Pinal County, Arizona, United States. The population was 374 at the 2010 census.

Geography
Lower Santan Village is located at  (33.142754, −111.78532).

Demographics

As of the 2010 census, there were 374 people living in the CDP: 177 male and 197 female. 144 were 19 years old or younger, 75 were ages 20–34, 66 were between the ages of 35 and 49, 75 were between 50 and 64, and the remaining 14 were aged 65 and above. The median age was 26.8 years.

The racial makeup of the CDP was 96.8% American Indian, 1.6% White, 0.3% Black or African American, and 1.3% two or more races.  15.8% of the population were Hispanic or Latino of any race.

There were 98 households in the CDP, 84 family households (85.7%) and 14 non-family households (14.3%), with an average household size of 3.68. Of the family households, 32 were married couples living together, while there were 11 single fathers and 41 single mothers; the non-family households included 9 adults living alone: 6 male and 3 female.

The CDP contained 103 housing units, of which 98 were occupied and 5 were vacant.

References

Census-designated places in Pinal County, Arizona